Clinton Howard "The Professor" Albright (February 28, 1926 – December 30, 1999) was a Canadian professional ice hockey centre. Born in Winnipeg, Manitoba, Albright played 59 games in the National Hockey League (NHL) for the New York Rangers in the 1948–49 season, wearing the number fifteen on his jersey. He was one of few players to wear glasses on the ice.

Playing career
Albright played junior hockey for the Winnipeg Monarchs, and twice went to the Memorial Cup with them, winning the tournament in 1946. At the University of Manitoba to study mechanical engineering, Albright played for the university team, and also played for the Allan Cup with the Winnipeg Flyers. After his single season with the Rangers, Albright returned to school to complete his degree, and was out of hockey all together by 1954.

Career statistics

Regular season and playoffs

Awards and achievements
Memorial Cup Championships (1946)

References

External links
 

1926 births
1999 deaths
Canadian ice hockey centres
Ice hockey people from Winnipeg
Manitoba Bisons ice hockey players
New York Rangers players
St. Paul Saints (USHL) players
Western International Hockey League players
Winnipeg Monarchs players